The 2022 WTA Tour (branded as the 2022 Hologic WTA Tour for sponsorship reasons) was the global elite women's professional tennis circuit organized by the Women's Tennis Association (WTA) for the 2022 tennis season. The 2022 WTA Tour calendar comprised the Grand Slam tournaments (supervised by the International Tennis Federation (ITF)), the WTA 1000 tournaments, the WTA 500 tournaments, the WTA 250 tournaments, the Billie Jean King Cup (organized by the ITF), and the year-end championships (the WTA Finals).

On December 1, 2021, WTA chairman Steve Simon announced that all tournaments scheduled to be held in both China and Hong Kong were suspended beginning in 2022, due to concerns regarding the security and well-being of tennis player Peng Shuai after her allegations of sexual assault against Zhang Gaoli, a high-ranking member of the Chinese Communist Party.

As part of international sports' reaction to the Russian invasion of Ukraine, the WTA, the ATP (Association of Tennis Professionals), the ITF, and the four Grand Slam tournaments jointly decided that players from Belarus and Russia would not be allowed to play under the names or flags of their countries, but would remain eligible to play events until further notice. On 20 May 2022, the ATP and WTA also announced that ranking points would not be awarded for Wimbledon, due to a decision by the All England Club to prohibit players representing Belarus or Russia from participating in the tournament.

In March 2022, Hologic, an American medical diagnostics and technology company, signed a multi-year deal to become the first WTA Tour title sponsor since 2010 after the WTA's partnership with Sony Ericsson had ended. Hologic cited the WTA's stance on withholding events in China in the wake of Peng's allegations as one of its factors in deciding to sponsor the circuit.

Schedule 
This is the complete schedule of events on the 2022 calendar.
Key

January

February

March

April

May

June

July

August

September

October

November

Affected tournaments 
The COVID-19 pandemic affected tournaments on both the ATP and WTA tours. The following tournaments were cancelled due to the pandemic or other reasons.

Statistical information
These tables present the number of singles (S), doubles (D), and mixed doubles (X) titles won by each player and each nation during the season, within all the tournament categories of the 2022 WTA Tour: the Grand Slam tournaments, the year-end championships (the WTA Finals), the WTA Premier tournaments (WTA 1000 and WTA 500), and the WTA 250. The players/nations are sorted by:

 total number of titles (a doubles title won by two players representing the same nation counts as only one win for the nation);
 cumulated importance of those titles (one Grand Slam win equalling two WTA 1000 wins, one year-end championships win equalling one-and-a-half WTA 1000 win, one WTA 1000 win equalling two WTA 500 wins, one WTA 500 win equalling two WTA 250 wins);
 a singles > doubles > mixed doubles hierarchy;
 alphabetical order (by family names for players).

Key

Titles won by player

Titles won by nation

 Notes

Titles information 
The following players won their first main circuit title in singles, doubles, or mixed doubles:
Singles

  Anastasia Potapova – Istanbul (draw)
  Martina Trevisan – Rabat (draw)
  Beatriz Haddad Maia – Nottingham (draw)
  Bernarda Pera – Budapest (draw)
  Marie Bouzková – Prague (draw)
  Linda Fruhvirtová – Chennai (draw)
  Mayar Sherif – Parma (draw)
  Anna Blinkova – Cluj-Napoca (draw)

Doubles

  Bernarda Pera – Melbourne 2 (draw)
  Jessica Pegula – Melbourne 1 (draw)
  Kaitlyn Christian – Guadalajara (draw)
  Catherine Harrison – Monterrey (draw)
  Sabrina Santamaria – Monterrey (draw)
  Aldila Sutjiadi – Bogota (draw)
  Magda Linette – Charleston (draw)
  Sophie Chang – Hamburg (draw)
  Angela Kulikov – Hamburg (draw)
  Anna Bondár – Palermo (draw)
  Alicia Barnett – Granby (draw)
  Olivia Nicholls – Granby (draw)
  Marta Kostyuk – Portorož (draw)
  Tereza Martincová – Portorož (draw)
  Anastasia Dețiuc – Parma (draw)
  Miriam Kolodziejová – Parma (draw)
  Alycia Parks – Ostrava (draw)

Mixed

  Ena Shibahara – Roland Garros (draw)
  Storm Sanders – US Open (draw)

The following players defended a main circuit title in singles, doubles, or mixed doubles:
 Singles
  Leylah Fernandez – Monterrey (draw)
  Iga Świątek – Rome (draw)
 Doubles
  Kimberley Zimmermann – Palermo (draw)
  Anna Danilina – Warsaw (draw)
 Mixed
  Desirae Krawczyk – Wimbledon (draw)

Best ranking
The following players achieved their career high ranking in this season inside top 50 (players who made their top 10 debut indicated in bold):

 Singles 

  Ann Li (reached place No. 44 on January 10)
  Elena Rybakina (reached place No. 12 on January 17)
  Sara Sorribes Tormo (reached place No. 32 on February 7)
  Clara Tauson (reached place No. 33 on February 7)
  Tereza Martincová (reached place No. 40 on February 14)
  Marta Kostyuk (reached place No. 49 on February 14)
  Jasmine Paolini (reached place No. 44 on February 21)
  Barbora Krejčíková (reached place No. 2 on February 28)
  Tamara Zidanšek (reached place No. 22 on February 28)
  Viktorija Golubic (reached place No. 35 on February 28)
  Nuria Párrizas Díaz (reached place No. 45 on March 7)
  Maria Sakkari (reached place No. 3 on March 21)
  Iga Świątek (reached place No. 1 on April 4)
  Camila Osorio (reached place No. 33 on April 4)
  Paula Badosa (reached place No. 2 on April 25)
  Anett Kontaveit (reached place No. 2 on June 6)
  Ons Jabeur (reached place No. 2 on June 27)
  Anhelina Kalinina (reached place No. 34 on June 27)
  Danielle Collins (reached place No. 7 on July 11)
  Emma Raducanu (reached place No. 10 on July 11)
  Jil Teichmann (reached place No. 21 on July 11)
  Martina Trevisan (reached place No. 24 on July 18)
  Mayar Sherif (reached place No. 44 on July 18)
  Anna Bondár (reached place No. 50 on July 18)
  Leylah Fernandez (reached place No. 13 on August 8)
  Shelby Rogers (reached place No. 30 on August 8)
  Beatriz Haddad Maia (reached place No. 15 on August 22)
  Aliaksandra Sasnovich (reached place No. 29 on September 19)
  Ana Bogdan (reached place No. 46 on October 3)
  Ekaterina Alexandrova (reached place No. 19 on October 17)
  Bernarda Pera (reached place No. 42 on October 17)
  Jessica Pegula (reached place No. 3 on October 24)
  Coco Gauff (reached place No. 4 on October 24)
  Daria Kasatkina (reached place No. 8 on October 24)
  Veronika Kudermetova (reached place No. 9 on October 24)
  Liudmila Samsonova (reached place No. 19 on October 24)
  Zheng Qinwen (reached place No. 25 on October 24)
  Marie Bouzková (reached place No. 26 on October 31)
  Ajla Tomljanović (reached place No. 33 on October 31)
  Anastasia Potapova (reached place No. 43 on October 31)

 Doubles  

  Nina Stojanović (reached place No. 37 on January 17)
  Nadiia Kichenok (reached place No. 29 on January 31)
  Raluca Olaru (reached place No. 30 on January 31)
  Iga Świątek (reached place No. 29 on February 14)
  Bernarda Pera (reached place No. 35 on February 21)
  Petra Martić (reached place No. 49 on February 21)
  Shelby Rogers (reached place No. 40 on February 28)
  Ena Shibahara (reached place No. 4 on March 21)
  Caty McNally (reached place No. 11 on April 4)
  Andreja Klepač (reached place No. 11 on April 11)
  Magda Linette (reached place No. 26 on April 11)
  Marie Bouzková (reached place No. 24 on May 9)
  Caroline Dolehide (reached place No. 21 on May 16)
  Natela Dzalamidze (reached place No. 43 on May 16)
  Veronika Kudermetova (reached place No. 2 on June 6)
  Zhang Shuai (reached place No. 2 on July 11)
  Gabriela Dabrowski (reached place No. 4 on July 11)
  Desirae Krawczyk (reached place No. 10 on July 11)
  Erin Routliffe  (reached place No. 29 on August 8)
  Coco Gauff (reached place No. 1 on August 15)
  Ekaterine Gorgodze (reached place No. 43 on August 15)
  Greet Minnen (reached place No. 47 on August 15)
  Jeļena Ostapenko (reached place No. 7 on September 12)
  Lyudmyla Kichenok (reached place No. 9 on September 12)
  Ulrikke Eikeri (reached place No. 40 on September 12)
  Marta Kostyuk (reached place No. 39 on September 19)
  Giuliana Olmos (reached place No. 7 on September 26)
  Taylor Townsend (reached place No. 32 on September 26)
  Asia Muhammad (reached place No. 28 on October 3)
  Ellen Perez (reached place No. 15 on October 17)
  Laura Siegemund (reached place No. 27 on October 17)
  Jessica Pegula (reached place No. 3 on October 24)
  Storm Sanders (reached place No. 8 on October 24)
  Zhaoxuan Yang (reached place No. 11 on October 24)
  Anna Danilina (reached place No. 12 on October 24)
  Beatriz Haddad Maia (reached place No. 13 on October 24)
  Sara Sorribes Tormo (reached place No. 39 on October 24)
  Anastasia Potapova (reached place No. 41 on October 24)
  Anna Bondár (reached place No. 47 on October 24)
  Kimberley Zimmermann (reached place No. 44 on October 31)
  Tereza Mihalíková (reached place No. 49 on October 31)

Points distribution
Points are awarded as follows:

S = singles players, D = doubles teams, Q = qualification players.
* Assumes undefeated Round Robin match record.

WTA rankings
Below are the tables for the WTA rankings and the yearly WTA Race rankings of the top 20 singles players, doubles players, and doubles teams.

Singles

Number 1 ranking

Doubles

Number 1 ranking

Prize money leaders

Comebacks
  Yanina Wickmayer (born 20 October 1989 in Lier, Belgium): After retreating from the tour due to pregnancy in October 2020 following the 2020 French Open, Wickmayer rejoined the professional circuit in her first tournament of the year at an International Tennis Federation (ITF) tournament in Porto in February 2022. In an interview with Sporza, she noted she still retained her passion for the game during her maternity leave and plans to remain on tour until at least the 2024 Summer Olympics in Paris, where she hopes to compete.
  Evgeniya Rodina

Retirements 
  Kristie Ahn (born 15 June 1992 in Flushing, New York City, New York, United States) turned professional in May 2008, and reached a career-high singles ranking of No. 87 in the world on 30 September 2019; she also reached No. 199 in doubles on 24 April 2017. She won seven singles titles on the ITF Tour, including a 80K title at the 2017 Tyler Challenge; she also won two doubles titles on the ITF Circuit. Her best result at a Grand Slam tournament was a fourth round finish at the 2019 US Open, defeating former top ten players Svetlana Kuznetsova and Jeļena Ostapenko before losing to Elise Mertens. Ahn announced her retirement on 5 March 2022 on Instagram.
  Lara Arruabarrena (born 20 March 1992 in Tolosa, Spain) turned professional in 2007, and reached a career-high singles ranking of No. 52 in the world on 3 July 2017; she also reached No. 28 in doubles on 28 February 2016. She won two singles and eight titles on the WTA Tour. Arruabarrena announced her retirement from tennis in August 2022.

  Ashleigh Barty (born 24 April 1996 in Ipswich, Australia) turned professional in 2010. A junior world No. 2, Barty won the girls' singles title at the 2011 Wimbledon Championships, and competed on the WTA Tour from 2012 to 2014, focusing mainly on doubles. Partnering Casey Dellacqua, Barty finished as a runner-up at three Grand Slam tournaments – the 2013 Australian Open, 2013 Wimbledon Championships, and 2013 US Open – won two WTA doubles titles, and reached a peak doubles ranking of No. 12 in the world on 21 October 2013; her highest singles ranking was No. 129 in the world, achieved on 30 September 2013 after winning four singles titles on the ITF circuit. At the end of the 2014 season, Barty announced that she would "take a break" from tennis, citing exhaustion, and focused on cricket for two years, playing for the Brisbane Heat in the WBBL. She announced her return to tennis in February 2016, and began to make her breakthrough in 2017. She won her maiden WTA singles title at the 2017 Malaysian Open, and won multiple doubles titles at WTA 1000 level and above in 2018, including her maiden Grand Slam title at the 2018 US Open, partnering CoCo Vandeweghe. Barty began to make great strides in her singles game from the start of 2019, winning the singles title at the 2019 Miami Open, a WTA 1000 event, before winning her maiden Grand Slam title at the 2019 French Open. Barty would rise to the world No. 1 ranking for the first time on 24 June 2019, and would hold it continuously from 9 September 2019 until the date of her retirement. In total, Barty would win 15 WTA Tour singles titles – including two further Grand Slam titles at the 2021 Wimbledon Championships and the 2022 Australian Open, becoming the first Australian woman to win the home Slam since Chris O'Neil in 1978, and the 2019 WTA Finals – and would win a total 12 WTA Tour doubles titles, reaching a career-high doubles ranking of No. 5 in the world on 21 May 2018; Barty would also win an Olympic bronze medal at the 2020 Summer Olympics in the mixed doubles competition, partnering John Peers, and led Australia to a runner-up finish at the 2019 Fed Cup. Barty would hold the WTA world No. 1 ranking for a total of 120 weeks, the seventh longest stint in history; 113 of these weeks were consecutive, which is the fifth longest consecutive run at No. 1 in history, tied with Chris Evert. Barty announced her retirement on 23 March 2022, citing a lack of desire to compete, in an interview with friend and former doubles partner Dellacqua, becoming the second player to retire as the world No. 1, after Justine Henin in 2008.
  Catherine "CiCi" Bellis (born 8 April 1999 in San Francisco, United States) turned professional in September 2016 and reached a career-high ranking of No. 35 in the world on 14 August 2017. She won one WTA 125K singles title at the 2016 Hawaii Open, and also won seven ITF singles titles; she won two doubles titles on the ITF circuit, reaching a career-high doubles ranking of No. 149 on 17 July 2017. At Grand Slams, she reached the third round of the 2016 US Open, 2017 French Open, and the 2020 Australian Open, and reached the quarterfinals of the 2017 Wimbledon Championships in doubles. After an injury-marred career, Bellis announced her retirement on 20 January 2022.

  Kim Clijsters (born 8 June 1983 in Bilzen, Belgium) turned professional in August 1997. A former world No. 1 in both singles and doubles, she first attained the ranking in singles on 11 August 2003, and in doubles on 4 August 2003. In total, Clijsters held the ranking in singles for 20 weeks, and was No. 1 in doubles for four weeks, and held both rankings concurrently in 2003, becoming one of only six women to achieve this feat. Clijsters experienced rapid success on the WTA Tour upon turning professional, reaching Grand Slam finals at the 2001 and 2003 French Opens, the 2003 US Open, and the 2004 Australian Open, winning 34 singles titles, including a maiden Grand Slam title at the 2005 US Open. She retired in 2007 following a series of injuries, before returning in 2009 following the birth of her daughter. She won her second Grand Slam tournament as an unranked player at the 2009 US Open, her third tournament played upon her comeback, before winning further Grand Slam tournaments at the 2010 US Open and the 2011 Australian Open, returning to the world No. 1 ranking on 14 February 2011. She retired for a second time in September 2012 due to injuries, before announcing her return in 2020. In a period of time affected by injuries and the COVID-19 pandemic, Clijsters played and lost five matches, before announcing her permanent retirement on 12 April 2022. In total, Clijsters won 41 WTA Tour singles titles, including three titles at the 2002, 2003, and the 2010 WTA Tour Championships and seven WTA 1000 titles, and also won 11 WTA doubles titles, including two Grand Slam titles at the 2003 French Open and the 2003 Wimbledon Championships, partnering Ai Sugiyama. She also led Belgium to the 2001 Fed Cup title alongside Justine Henin; this is, to date, Belgium's only title at the Fed Cup. Clijsters was inducted into the International Tennis Hall of Fame in 2017.
  Kirsten Flipkens announced the Wimbledon Championships would be the last singles tournament of her career.
  Lucie Hradecká (born 21 May 1985 in Prague, Czechoslovakia) A three-time Grand Slam doubles champion and 26-time WTA Tour doubles titlist, she reached her career-high doubles ranking of world No. 4 in October 2012. She retired in October 2022, her last match was at the 2022 Guadalajara Open Akron.

  Jelena Janković (born 28 February 1985 in Belgrade, SFR Yugoslavia; now Serbia) turned professional in 2000. A former world No. 1 in singles, Janković first attained the ranking on 11 August 2008, and held the ranking for 18 weeks in total; her career-high doubles ranking of No. 19 in the world was attained on 9 June 2014. One of the most successful players of her era, Janković won 15 singles titles on the WTA Tour, including six at WTA 1000 level; she also won two doubles titles on the WTA Tour. At the Grand Slam level, Janković reached one singles final, at the 2008 US Open, and entered the second week on 21 further occasions. Furthermore, she won the mixed doubles title at the 2007 Wimbledon Championships, partnering Jamie Murray. Janković played her last competitive match in 2017, taking an extended break due to a severe back injury. Despite tentatively making a comeback in 2020, partnering compatriot Novak Djokovic in an exhibition mixed doubles match, Janković did not return to the WTA Tour, and eventually announced her retirement in 2022. In an interview with Serbian news outlet B92, Janković stated that she was retiring due to continuing injuries, and also as she felt she could not balance a professional tennis career with motherhood.
  Jovana Jović (born 30 September 1993 in Belgrade, FR Yugoslavia; now Serbia) turned professional in June 2009. Jović reached one WTA singles final in her career, at the 2014 Monterrey Open, and won 17 singles titles on the ITF circuit; she reached a career-high singles ranking of No. 102 in the world on 12 May 2014. Jović also won four doubles titles on the ITF circuit, reaching a career-high doubles ranking of No. 204 in the world on 31 July 2017. Jović announced her retirement on 5 March 2022, a year after playing her final competitive match, beginning a career as a tennis coach.
  Paula Kania-Choduń (born 6 November 1992 in Sosnowiec, Poland) announced her retirement from tennis in December 2022.
  Quirine Lemoine (born 25 December 1991 in Woerden, Netherlands) turned professional in 2008. Lemoine won 19 singles titles on the ITF circuit, reaching a career-high singles ranking of No. 137 in the world on 3 July 2017. Lemoine won one WTA Tour doubles title, at the 2017 Swedish Open, and 27 ITF doubles titles, peaking at No. 116 in the doubles rankings on 14 August 2017. In July 2022, Lemoine announced her retirement at the ITF 60K Amstelveen tournament.
  Cornelia Lister (born 26 May 1994 in Oslo, Norway) turned professional in November 2010. Lister won one singles title on the ITF circuit, reaching a career-high singles ranking of No. 383 in the world on 7 May 2018. Known for her doubles prowess, Lister won one WTA Tour doubles title, at the 2019 Palermo International, and 25 ITF doubles titles, peaking at No. 72 in the doubles rankings on 3 February 2020. Lister announced her retirement on 10 January 2022, citing a lack of motivation and desire to compete.
  Christina McHale (born 11 May 1992 in Teaneck, New Jersey) turned professional in 2010. Played her last match at the 2022 US Open qualifying competition.
  Mandy Minella (born 22 November 1985 in Esch-sur-Alzette, Luxembourg) turned professional in 2001. she peaked at No. 66 in the WTA singles rankings in September 2012, and No. 47 in doubles in April 2013.
  Kurumi Nara (born 30 December 1991 in Osaka, Japan) turned professional in 2009. Her final tournament of her career was the Toray Pan Pacific Open in September, where she competed as a qualifying wildcard.
  Risa Ozaki (born 10 April 1994 in Kobe, Japan) She announced her retirement from tennis in 2022.
  Peng Shuai (born 8 January 1986 in Xiangtan, China) turned professional in June 2001. Peng had a career-high singles ranking of No. 14 in the world, achieved on 22 August 2011, and was a former doubles World No. 1, first attaining the ranking on 17 February 2014. She won two WTA singles titles, and reached the semifinals of the 2014 US Open. In addition, Peng also won 23 doubles titles, including two Grand Slams, at the 2013 Wimbledon Championships and the 2014 French Open, both partnering Hsieh Su-wei. In November 2021, Peng made an allegation of sexual assault against retired Chinese politician Zhang Gaoli on Weibo, and subsequently disappeared from the public eye, with her post being subject to blanket censorship in China. In February 2022, in an interview with French publication L'Équipe, conducted in the presence of officials from the Chinese Olympic Committee, Peng retracted her allegation of sexual assault, describing the events as a "misunderstanding". She also announced her retirement from the sport at the conclusion of the 2022 Winter Olympics, citing injuries and the ongoing COVID-19 pandemic as reasons for her decision.
  Květa Peschke (born 9 July 1975 in Bílovec, Czechoslovakia; now Czech Republic) turned professional in April 1993. Peschke, née Hrdličková, had a career-high singles ranking of No. 26 in the world, achieved on 7 November 2005, and was a former doubles World No. 1, first attaining the ranking on 4 July 2011. Peschke won one WTA singles title, at the 1998 Makarska Open, and also won 10 singles titles on the ITF circuit. She also reached the fourth round of the 1999 Wimbledon Championships, her best result at a Grand Slam tournament in singles. Peschke was best known for her doubles prowess, winning 36 titles, including one Grand Slam title at the 2011 Wimbledon Championships, and seven titles at WTA 1000 level. Peschke announced her retirement on 8 April 2022, playing her final match at the Charleston Open. She plans to retire officially at 2022 Wimbledon.
  Andrea Petkovic (born 9 September 1987 in Tuzla, SFR Yugoslavia) turned professional in 2006. Petkovic, had a career-high singles ranking of No. 9 in the world, achieved on 10 October 2011. Petkovic won seven WTA singles and one WTA doubles title and also won 9 singles titles and 3 doubles on the ITF circuit. She also reached the semifinal of the 2014 French Open, her best result at a Grand Slam tournament in singles. Petkovic announced her retirement in August 2022.
  Monica Puig (born 27 September 1993 in San Juan, Puerto Rico) turned professional in 2010. She had a career-high singles ranking of No. 27 in the world, achieved on 26 September 2016; her career-high doubles ranking of No. 210 was achieved on 25 May 2015. Puig won her maiden WTA Tour singles title at the 2014 Internationaux de Strasbourg, and achieved her best result at a Grand Slam at the 2013 Wimbledon Championships, where she reached the fourth round. Puig reached worldwide prominence by winning a gold medal at the 2016 Rio Olympics, defeating top-ten players Garbiñe Muguruza and Angelique Kerber en route, becoming the first athlete ever to win a gold medal for Puerto Rico at the Summer Olympics. Despite her historic success, Puig experienced a loss of form, falling out of the top 50 in June 2017, and returning only for 11 weeks throughout the remainder of her career. Later, Puig struggled with injuries, notably to her elbow and her shoulder, and had four surgeries over a three-year period. On 13 June 2022, Puig announced her retirement from tennis, stating "my body has had enough".
  Laura Robson (born 21 January 1994 in Melbourne, Australia) turned professional in 2007.  Robson was the first British woman since Samantha Smith at the 1998 Wimbledon Championships to reach the fourth round of a Grand Slam, doing so at the 2012 US Open and the 2013 Wimbledon Championships. At the 2012 Guangzhou Women's Open, Robson became the first British woman since Jo Durie in 1990 to reach a WTA Tour final, where she lost to Hsieh Su-wei. She was named WTA Newcomer of the Year for 2012 and reached a career-high singles ranking of world No. 27 on 8 July 2013. In doubles, she won a silver medal in the mixed-doubles competition at the 2012 London Olympics playing with Andy Murray, with whom she also reached the 2010 Hopman Cup final, and she attained a career-high doubles ranking of No. 82 on 17 March 2014. Robson suffered from various injuries throughout the 2014 and 2015 seasons, notably to her left (and dominant) wrist for which she underwent surgery in April 2014, resulting in multiple prolonged absences from the WTA Tour. After returning to full-time tennis in January 2016 post-injury, Robson struggled with form and did not return to the top 150 in singles tennis, and continued to struggle with injuries throughout the remainder of her career. On 16 May 2022, Robson announced her retirement from the sport, aged 28.
  Andrea Sestini Hlaváčková (born 10 August 1986 in Plzeň, Czechoslovakia; now Czech Republic) turned professional in 2004. She reached a career-high singles ranking of No. 58 in the world on 10 September 2012, after reaching the fourth round of the US Open; this would be her best result in singles at a Grand Slam. She reached one WTA Tour singles final, at the 2013 Gastein Open, and won eight singles titles on the ITF circuit. Known primarily as a doubles specialist, Sestini Hlaváčková reached a career-high ranking of No. 3 in the world on 22 October 2012. She would win 27 WTA Tour titles in doubles, including two Grand Slam titles at the 2011 French Open and the 2013 US Open, both partnering Lucie Hradecká. She would also reach the finals of the 2012 Wimbledon Championships, 2012 US Open, and 2016 Australian Open partnering Hradecká, and reached the finals of the 2017 Australian Open partnering Peng Shuai. She would also win a further Grand Slam title in mixed doubles at the 2013 US Open, partnering Max Mirnyi, and won the title at the 2017 WTA Finals, partnering Tímea Babos. Sestini Hlaváčková won three doubles titles at WTA 1000 level, and was an Olympic medallist, winning silver at the 2012 London Olympics, and finishing in fourth place at the 2016 Rio Olympics; she also won 19 doubles titles on the ITF circuit. She announced her retirement on 17 June 2022, retiring after participating in the 2022 Prague Open; this was her first tournament since 2018, having taken a break from the tour after giving birth to her daughter.
  İpek Soylu (born 15 April 1996 in Adana, Turkey) turned professional in 2012. Soylu reached a career-high singles ranking of No. 151 in the world on 31 October 2016; she also reached No. 63 in doubles on 17 April 2017. She won three doubles titles on the WTA Tour,her biggest coming at the 2016 year-end Elite Trophy.She has also won twelve singles and eighteen doubles titles on the ITF Circuit. Soylu announced her retirement from tennis in September 2022.
  Katarina Srebotnik (born 12 March 1981 in Slovenj Gradec, Yugoslavia) turned professional in 1999. Srebotnik is a former world number 1 in doubles. Although she played her last match at Roland Garros in 2020, she was officially honored for her career in Portorož in September 2022.
  Elena Vesnina 
  Stefanie Vögele (born 10 March 1990 in Leuggern, Switzerland) announced her retirement from tennis in November 2022.

See also 

 2022 WTA 125 tournaments
 2022 ITF Women's World Tennis Tour
 2022 ATP Tour
 International Tennis Federation
 Current tennis rankings

Notes

References

External links 
 Women's Tennis Association (WTA) official website
 International Tennis Federation (ITF) official website
 Billie Jean King Cup (BJK Cup) official website

 
WTA Tour seasons
WTA Tour